Since their first match in 2005, 103 players have represented Australia in Twenty20 Internationals. A Twenty20 International is an international cricket match between two representative teams, as determined by the International Cricket Council (ICC). A Twenty20 International is played under the rules of Twenty20 cricket. The list is arranged in the order in which each player won his first Twenty20 cap. Where more than one player won his first Twenty20 cap in the same match, those players are listed alphabetically by surname.

Australia played against New Zealand in the first ever Twenty20 International.

Key

Players
Statistics are correct as of 5 November 2022.

Captains

See also
List of Australian Test cricketers
List of Australian ODI cricketers

Notes

References

External links
 Player Caps – Cricinfo Australia

Twenty20 International cricketers
Australia